Taeb Kola (also Romanized as Ţā’eb Kolā) is a village in Kelardasht-e Gharbi Rural District, Kelardasht District, Chalus County, Mazandaran Province, Iran. At the 2006 census, its population was 304, in 79 families.

References 

Populated places in Chalus County